King of the Castle is a 1926 British silent drama film directed by Henry Edwards and starring Marjorie Hume, Brian Aherne and Dawson Millward. It was based on a 1922 novel by Keble Howard, who approved the scenario and wrote some of the intertitles.

Many of the outdoor scenes were filmed in Cornwall.

Cast
 Marjorie Hume as Lady Oxborrow
 Brian Aherne as Colin O'Farrell
 Dawson Millward as Chris Furlong
 Prudence Vanbrugh as Leslie Rain
 Moore Marriott as Peter Coffin
 Albert E. Raynor as Matlock
 E.C. Matthews as Ezekiel Squence

References

External links

 (HathiTrust digital library)

1926 films
British silent feature films
British drama films
Films directed by Henry Edwards
British films based on plays
British black-and-white films
Films shot in Cornwall
1926 drama films
1920s English-language films
1920s British films
Silent drama films